Hammarö Municipality (Hammarö kommun) is a municipality in Värmland County in west central Sweden. Its seat is located in the town of Skoghall.

The municipality was created from Hammarö parish in 1863, and its territory has not been affected by the great municipal reforms of 1952 and 1971. With a land area of only  it is Sweden's 12th smallest, as well as the smallest in Värmland County.

Geography
The municipality consists of the islands Hammarön and Vidön and the adjacent archipelago. The name Hammarö, or Hammarön (the name of the island itself), refers to hammare, a rocky area where deciduous trees grow. The island itself is  large, the third largest island of Lake Vänern, and located off the shore of Värmland, separated by the Klarälven river delta.

Karlstad Municipality is the only municipality with bridge connections to Hammarö.

Localities
Skoghall
Vidöåsen
While the vast majority of Hammarö's inhabitants live in a single urban area going by the Statistics Sweden designation of Skoghall, this urban area is split in two postal areas: Skoghall (western part) and Hammarö (eastern part). The name Skoghall is seldom used for the urban area in its entirety.

Economy
100 years ago the largest employers were all in the fishing sectors. Today, the company Stora Enso Skoghall, manufacturing cardboard boxes, has 950 employees. Second is Akzo Nobel Base Chemicals with 150, manufacturing chemical products.

Elections

Riksdag
These are the local results of the Riksdag elections since the 1972 municipality reform. The results of the Sweden Democrats were not published by SCB between 1988 and 1998 at a municipal level to the party's small nationwide size at the time. "Votes" denotes valid votes, whereas "Turnout" denotes also blank and invalid votes.

Blocs

This lists the relative strength of the socialist and centre-right blocs since 1973, but parties not elected to the Riksdag are inserted as "other", including the Sweden Democrats results from 1988 to 2006, but also the Christian Democrats pre-1991 and the Greens in 1982, 1985 and 1991. The sources are identical to the table above. The coalition or government mandate marked in bold formed the government after the election. New Democracy got elected in 1991 but are still listed as "other" due to the short lifespan of the party. "Elected" is the total number of percentage points from the municipality that went to parties who were elected to the Riksdag.

Sister cities
Enebakk, Norway
Poel, Germany
Małkinia Górna, Poland

References

External links

Hammarö Municipality - Official site

Municipalities of Värmland County